Watercity is an aquatic park in the area of Anopolis, between Hersonissos and Heraklion on Crete, Greece. It has 36 water games in 87,000 square metres.

It is a member of the World Waterpark Association (WWA).

Water parks in Greece
Buildings and structures in Heraklion (regional unit)
Tourist attractions in Crete